is a 2016 Japanese drama film directed by Hideo Nakata. It was released by Nikkatsu as the fifth film in the reboot of its Roman Porno ("romantic pornography") series. Other directors involved in the series include Sion Sono, Akihiko Shiota, Kazuya Shiraishi, and Isao Yukisada.

Plot
Tokiko, a renowned ceramic artist, and her husband encounter Haruka, a teenage runaway, and take her into their home, where Tokiko teaches her about ceramics. When Tokiko's husband dies, Haruka promises to remain with her teacher and to do anything that she asks. They develop a lesbian relationship but Tokiko drowns her sorrows in alcohol and has a series of meaningless sexual encounters with a variety of men while Haruka can hear them in another room.

Tokiko eventually invites Satoru, a promising young student, to be her apprentice and initiates a sexual relationship with him, even though he tells her that he has a girlfriend. Satoru becomes interested in Haruka, who is the same age as he is, and aggressively flirts with her. Tokiko catches them and angrily accuses Haruka of liking men, forcing them to have sex on the table in front of her. Satoru's girlfriend Akane discovers them and grabs a large kitchen knife, threatening to kill herself. Satoru jumps at her and she cuts him with the knife. She then charges at Tokiko with the knife but Haruka jumps in front of Tokiko and is stabbed in the stomach.

At a future date, Haruka surprises Tokiko by returning to her atelier, where the two make love again.

Cast
Rin Asuka as Haruka
Kaori Yamaguchi as Tokiko / Ceramist
Shōma Machii as Satoru
Kanako Nishikawa as Akane / Satoru's girlfriend
Ichirō Mikami
Yuki Enomoto
Miki Hayashida
Kōko Itō
Tarō Kamakura
Hisako Matsuyama

Release
The film premiered at the Busan International Film Festival in Busan, South Korea on October 7, 2016, and was later released in Japan on February 11, 2017.

Reception
James Marsh of the South China Morning Post gave the film 1.5/5 stars in a negative review in which he wrote that the director "fails to rise above plot's perfunctory soft core trappings in this unimaginatively told story of infatuation and jealousy".

References

External links

2016 films
2010s Japanese-language films
2010s Japanese films
Japanese drama films
2016 drama films
Nikkatsu Roman Porno
Japanese LGBT-related films
Lesbian-related films
2016 LGBT-related films
LGBT-related drama films